Cypriano Ferrandini (1823 – December 20, 1910) was a barber from Corsica who emigrated to the United States, and established himself as the long-time barber and hairdresser in the basement of Barnum's Hotel, in Baltimore, Maryland. There he practiced his trade from the mid-1850s to his retirement long after the close of the Civil War. He was accused, but never indicted for plotting to assassinate U.S. President-elect Abraham Lincoln on February 23, 1861, and while once caught in a secessionist dragnet in 1862, was never prosecuted for his pro-Southern convictions.

On the nights of February 21 and 22, 1861, Allan Pinkerton and Frederick Seward warned Lincoln that he ought not to appear in public in Baltimore as scheduled because plans were afoot to assassinate him. Lincoln chose to heed the warning, donned a disguise of a soft cap, and passed through Baltimore unseen and unheralded on the night of the 22nd, leaving Mrs. Lincoln and the children to face the crowd awaiting his arrival from Harrisburg the following day, February 23, 1861.

Role in alleged conspiracy
There is disagreement among historians as to whether a plot to assassinate Lincoln in Baltimore actually existed and Ferrandini's role in such a plot. John Thomas Scharf argued that there was no credible evidence of a plot and no one was ever arrested for even contemplating one, although many other citizens were thrown into jail without benefit of habeas corpus while William Evitts, in A Matter of Allegiances,  argued in favor of there being such a plot based on the papers of Allan Pinkerton which The Huntington Library acquired, and which Norma B. Cuthbert edited for publication in 1949.

The only purported contemporary account of Pinkerton is the transcript of his 1861 journal. Pinkerton's account relies upon one agent and two sources to document Cypriano Ferrandini as the leader of the assassination plot. His agent met with Cypriano and reported the extent of the plot.  In Spy of the Rebellion (1883), Pinkerton asserts that in addition to his spy Howard, he also met with Captain Ferrandini (whom he calls Fernandina), at Guy's Monument Hotel. At Guy's, Pinkerton reports that "Fernandina cordially grasped my hand, and we all retired to a private saloon, where after ordering the necessary drinks and cigars, the conversation" turned to the assassination and Ferrandini was asked "Are there no other means of saving the South except by assassination?"  "No replied Fernandina, ... He must die – and die he shall, And, ... if necessary, we will die together."  To illustrate his story, Pinkerton included a drawing of himself seated at a table with Ferrandini standing, hand upraised as if clutching a dagger. Pinkerton later began to doubt Ferrandi's boast. 

Eighteen days before the alleged timing of the terrorist attack on Lincoln, Cypriano Ferrandini appeared before a Congressional Committee  investigating rumors that efforts would be made to prevent the President-elect from reaching his inaugural, or if he did manage to get to Washington, seriously disrupt the ceremonies. The committee had been formed at the end of January when the Union appeared to be rapidly dissolving. Ferrandini told the committee the following February that he made his secessionists views very clear and had no problems admitting that he was engaged in applying his military training to a group dedicated to preventing the "Northern Volunteers" from  passing through Maryland.

See also

Baltimore Plot
American Civil War spies
Allan Pinkerton
John Wilkes Booth
Ward Hill Lamon
George Proctor Kane 
Hattie Lawton

Notes
Cuthbert, Norma Barrett (ed.). Lincoln and the Baltimore Plot, 1861. (1949). Note that the factual content of this entry is based upon the on line biography by Dr. Edward C. Papenfuse at the Maryland State Archives web site: http://www.msa.md.gov/megafile/msa/speccol/sc3500/sc3520/014400/014473/html/14473bio.html.
Evitts, William J., A Matter of Allegiances- Maryland from 1850-1861(Baltimore: Johns Hopkins University Press,1974). Professor Evitts assessment of Ferrandini has been strengthened by Michael J. Kline, The Baltimore Plot. The First Conspiracy to Assassinate Abraham Lincoln (Yardley, Pennsylvania: Westholme Publishing, LLC, 2008). 
Pinkerton, A. (1883). The Spy of the Rebellion; being a true history of the spy system of the United States Army during the late rebellion. Revealing many secrets of the war hitherto not made public. Comp. from official reports prepared for President Lincoln, General McClellan and the provost-marshal-general. New York, G.W. Carleton & Co.
United States. Congress. House. Select committee of five, appointed January 9, 1861 (1865). See: https://archive.org/details/allegedhostileor00unit

References

External links 
 

1823 births
1910 deaths
19th-century American people
American people of Corsican descent
French emigrants to the United States
People from Corsica
Lincoln assassination conspirators
Failed assassins of presidents of the United States
Baltimore Plot
People of Maryland in the American Civil War
American failed assassins
People from Baltimore